In the Catholic Church, communicatio in sacris ("communion in sacred [things]"; also translated as "worship in common"), also called communicatio in divinis ("communion in divine [things]") or communicatio in ritibus ("communion in rites"), designates the regulations for the partaking of a Catholic person to a non-Catholic sacrament or liturgical celebration, or for the partaking of a non-Catholic person to a Catholic sacrament or liturgical celebration. The expression is also used to refer to said acts of partaking themselves.

Communicatio in sacris is legislated mainly by two canons: canon 844 of the 1983 Code of Canon Law, and canon 671 of the Code of Canons of the Eastern Churches.

Canon 844 
Canon 844 is a canon contained within the 1983 Code of Canon Law (1983CIC) of the Catholic Church, which defines the licit administration and reception of certain sacraments of the Catholic Church in normative and in particular exceptional circumstances, known in Catholic canonical theory as communicatio in sacris.

Thomas Condon wrote that this canon "empowers the bishop to regulate sacramental sharing for Catholics who might need to approach a non-Catholic minister; [...] the canon enjoins the bishop to prevent a spirit of indifferentism from emerging because of sacramental sharing."
Condon wrote that Frederick R. McManus "noted that 'the intent of the canon is clear, namely to define the outer limits of permissible sharing of sacraments, aside from any question of validity or invalidity'." The Second Vatican Council's decree on ecumenism, Unitatis Redintegratio (UR), states that "worship in common is not to be considered as a means to be used indiscriminately for the restoration of Christian unity." In that context, John Beal et al.'s New commentary on the Code of Canon Law notes that this canon does not address the specific question of "the seriousness of the need" on occasions of worship in common such as a marriage or funeral or similar ecumenical activities, though individual Catholic theologians, such as Kevin Considine, have interpreted canon 844 as allowing for intercommunion in these cases.

Structure 
The structure of canon 844 is that the "general principle is established" first, then this canon "considers three situations of facts" which are exceptions, and finally this canon "regulates the lawful exercise of the normative activity in a particular area."

In Ecclesia de Eucharistia (EE), Pope John Paul II asked the Roman Curia "to prepare a more specific document, including prescriptions of a juridical nature," which Daniel Merz wrote, in The Liturgy Documents, were "in light of liturgical abuses in violation of liturgical norms." Within several months, in 2004, the Congregation for Divine Worship and the Discipline of the Sacraments (CCDDS) gave those instructions in Redemptionis Sacramentum (RS). Merz made clear that  "should be understood as binding norms for interpreting and carrying out the liturgical laws" and "is intended to be read as a companion to" . The instruction, in  pertaining to this canon, is that "Catholic ministers licitly administer the Sacraments only to the Catholic faithful, who likewise receive them licitly only from Catholic ministers, except for those situations for which provision is made in" canon 844 §§2–4, and Canon 861 §2. Furthermore, "the conditions comprising" canon 844 §4, "from which no dispensation can be given, cannot be separated; thus, it is necessary that all of these conditions be present together."

Principle 
The principle found in section one of canon 844 is that "Catholic ministers administer the sacraments licitly to Catholic members of the Christian faithful alone."
"Paragraph one governs the licit, rather than the valid administration of sacraments to Catholics," according to Condon.
This principle covers all sacraments of the Catholic Church. "The general principle is clear" as Caparros et al. describes that "Catholic ministers may lawfully administer the sacraments to Catholic faithful, who in their turn may only receive them lawfully from Catholic ministers."

Exception one 
The first exception is cited in section one.
The first exception to canon 844 is that if "an ordinary minister is absent or impeded, a catechist or another person designated for this function by the local ordinary, or in a case of necessity any person with the right intention, confers baptism licitly." So, for the §1 exception all of these conditions must be present together for licitness:
A case of necessity.
Any administrant, whether Catholic or non-Catholic or non-Christian, with the right intention.
Any recipient who is "not yet baptized".
Only for reception of the sacrament of Christian baptism.

Exception two 
The second exception is found in section two. "Whenever necessity requires it or true spiritual advantage suggests it, and provided that danger of error or of indifferentism is avoided, the Christian faithful for whom it is physically or morally impossible to approach a Catholic minister are permitted to receive the sacraments of penance, Eucharist, and anointing of the sick from non-Catholic ministers in whose Churches these sacraments are valid." Peter Vere pointed out "that the word 'Church' in" canon 844 §2 is capitalized. "The canon does not say that Catholics may receive the aforementioned sacraments from 'non-Catholic ministers in whose churches these sacraments are valid.' Vere considered canon 16 §1 and canon 17: canon 16 §1 "means that the canons contained within the"  "are legitimately interpreted by" the legislator, i.e. Pope John Paul II "and his successors", and "those whom he has delegated to interpret the" . Canon 17 "means that the canons must be understood according to both the text and the context in which they find themselves. In cases of doubt, one should seek references elsewhere as to what was the purpose of the law, and the mind of the legislator in passing the law." Applying the "legal norms" of canon 16 §1 and canon 17 to canon 844 §2, "we see that the intention of the legislator, within the context of the canon, is to permit Catholics under certain circumstance to receive the sacraments from non-Catholic ministers of Churches in which the sacraments are valid. This is not a permission to receive the sacraments from non-Catholic ministers in whose churches the sacraments are valid. The difference being that the sacraments must be valid owing to the denominational Church to which the non-Catholic minister belongs, and not merely from the validity of the minister's ordination. For example, one could not receive the sacraments from a priest validly ordained within the Catholic Church who later defected from the Catholic Faith and now ministers within the Episcopalian ecclesial communion. Nor could one approach a validly-ordained non-Catholic minister who ministers the sacraments independently of the jurisdiction of a Church in which these sacraments are valid." So, Vere wrote, applying the "legal norms" of canon 17, "we must look at parallel laws to see what the legislator means by the term 'Church' when granting permission under" canon 844 §2 "to receive the sacraments from non-Catholic ministers in whose Churches they are valid."

"The most important document that clarifies the mind and intention of the legislator," wrote Vere, is the Pontifical Council for Promoting Christian Unity's (PCPCU) Directory for the application of principles and norms on ecumenism (1993ED) which contains "parallel laws" that "clarify the intention of the legislator with regards to" this canon. So, for the §2 exception all of these conditions must be present together for licitness:
A case of necessity, or a case of true spiritual advantage. Caparros et al. quoting from In quibus rerum circumstantiis remarked that, "It must be remembered that the sacraments 'are not mere instruments for satisfying individual desires only'."

The minister is of a non-Catholic Eastern Church in which these sacraments are valid, or the minister is of a non-Catholic Western Church in which these sacraments are valid or "who is known to be validly ordained according to the Catholic teaching on ordination". The Catholic Church does not recognize the ordination of women, and believes specifically that Anglican ordinations are invalid.

Error and indifferentism are avoided. Caparros et al. comments that, "this is a basic criterion, expressed in  26" which states that participation in worship "which harms the unity of the Church or involves formal acceptance of error or the danger of aberration in the faith, of scandal and indifferentism, is forbidden." In cases of doubt, the recipient should seek references elsewhere. A Catholic recipient who manifests indifference could not apply the provisions of this canon to licitly receive a sacrament from a non-Catholic minister.
The recipient is Catholic for whom access to a Catholic minister is physically or morally impossible. Beal et al. recognized this to include a limitation "such as serious inconvenience."
Only for reception of three sacraments: Penance, Eucharist, and Anointing of the Sick.
Within the prescribed limits regulated by the diocesan bishop and conference of bishops. So to licitly apply the provisions of canon 844 § 2, a Catholic recipient must, if possible, contact the Catholic diocese in which the sacrament might potentially be received, to understand the established norms and prohibitions of the diocesan bishop as well as about specific heretical or schismatic groups and ministers that may be operating in the area. If there is a prohibition, a Catholic recipient engaged in it could be "guilty of prohibited participation in sacred rites".
Practiced according to the norm that a recipient "who legitimately wishes to communicate with Eastern Christians must respect the Eastern discipline as much as possible and refrain from communicating if that Church restricts sacramental communion to its own members to the exclusion of others."

Vere considered  norm 123, norm 130, norm 131, and norm 132. Vere identified the fact that, in conformity with norm 123, "Catholics may enjoy the full benefit of" canon 844 §2 "when approaching a minister of a non-Catholic Eastern Church in which the sacraments are valid, in order to receive the sacraments." On the other hand, explains Vere, norm 123 "does not apply when approaching the minister of a non-Catholic Western Church in which the sacraments are valid. Rather, this situation is covered under" the "much stricter" norm 132. Considering that norm 132 "specifies Church in the universal sense, and not Church ," Vere points out that, "this norm cannot be interpreted in the sense that the Catholic is unable to approach a Catholic priest of his own liturgical rite."

Society of St. Pius X 
Vere wrote in 1999 that with respect to the canonical situation of the Society of St. Pius X (SSPX), "this prohibition has been confirmed" by the Pontifical Commission Ecclesia Dei (PCED), that Masses celebrated by the  "are also valid, but it is considered morally illicit for the faithful to participate in these Masses unless they are physically or morally impeded from participating in a Mass celebrated by a Catholic priest in good standing." Vere writes that the Pontifical Commission Ecclesia Dei (PCED) – which, in some cases, "has been delegated the power of authentic interpretation of" canon 844 §2 – "does not consider the lack of opportunity to assist at a Tridentine Mass sufficient cause to receive the sacraments from a Lefebvrite [i.e. ] cleric". For this reason, "in light of" canons 16–17 and Norms 130–132, "one cannot invoke" canon 844 §2 "in order to receive the sacraments from a Lefebvrite priest simply because a Tridentine Mass is lacking."

Thus where to classify the  schism at the moment represents an internal dilemma for the Church". According to the  the  "is not concerned with the" . "The situation of the members of" the  "is an internal matter of the Catholic Church" and the  "is not another Church or Ecclesial Community in the meaning used in the" . Analogously the Tribunal of the Roman Rota wrote about "dealing with a priest belonging in virtue of ordination to the" , "which lacked the necessary canonical legitimacy in the Church at the time of the celebration of the marriage," under the circumstances, accordingly "was like an acephalous or transient or 'freelance' priest, and consequently, did not seek from anyone the faculty".

Exception three 
The third exception is found in section three. "Catholic ministers administer the sacraments of penance, Eucharist, and anointing of the sick licitly to members of Eastern Churches which do not have full communion with the Catholic Church if they seek such on their own accord and are properly disposed. This is also valid for members of other Churches which in the judgment of the Apostolic See are in the same condition in regard to the sacraments as these Eastern Churches." So, for the §3 exception all of these conditions must be present together for licitness:
A case when the sacrament is requested. Caparros et al. comments that, "any prior pressure by the Catholic minister is clearly forbidden."
The minister is Catholic.
The recipient is a baptized properly disposed Eastern non-Catholic. Caparros et al. elucidates that, because "the word Oriental is very general, it is advisable to verify in each case that the subject fulfills the faith requirements laid down by ecclesiastical authority. This applies with equal strictness to members of other Churches that, in the opinion of the" Apostolic See, "are in a similar situation to the Oriental ones." In the United States, this includes Christians of the Eastern Orthodox Churches, the Assyrian Church of the East, and the Polish National Catholic Church.
Only for reception of three sacraments: penance, Eucharist, and anointing of the sick.
Within the prescribed limits regulated by the diocesan bishop and conference of bishops.
Practiced according to the norm that "due consideration should be given to the discipline of the Eastern Churches for their own faithful".
Practiced according to the norm that "any suggestion of proselytism should be avoided."

Exception four 
The fourth exception is found in section four. "If the danger of death is present or if, in the judgment of the diocesan bishop or conference of bishops, some other grave necessity urges it, Catholic ministers administer these same sacraments licitly also to other Christians not having full communion with the Catholic Church, who cannot approach a minister of their own community and who seek such on their own accord, provided that they manifest Catholic faith in respect to these sacraments and are properly disposed." So, for the §4 exception all of these conditions must be present together for licitness:
A case of a danger of death, or
a case of a grave necessity, in the judgment of the diocesan bishop or conference of bishops.
The minister is Catholic who "will judge individual cases and administer these sacraments only in accord with [...] established norms, where they exist" or "the norms of" .
The recipient is a baptized properly disposed Western non-Catholic with "manifest Catholic faith in this sacrament".
Only for reception of three sacraments: penance, Eucharist, and anointing of the sick.
Within the prescribed limits regulated by the diocesan bishop and conference of bishops.
Practiced according to the norm that the recipient is "unable to have recourse for the sacrament desired to a minister of his or her own Church or ecclesial Community".
Practiced according to the norm that the recipient "ask for the sacrament of his or her own initiative".

Regulation 
The regulation is found in section five. "For the cases mentioned in §§2, 3, and 4, the diocesan bishop or conference of bishops is not to issue general norms except after consultation at least with the local competent authority of the interested non-Catholic Church or community."
 states that "it is strongly recommended that the diocesan Bishop, taking into account any norms which may have been established for this matter by the Episcopal Conference or by the Synods of Eastern Catholic Churches, establish general norms for judging situations of grave and pressing need and for verifying the conditions"
Beal et al. elaborated that in consideration of the ethic of reciprocity, "the underlying purpose" in §5 is "not to act unilaterally" but the language "is carefully constructed to leave the diocesan bishop" or conference of bishops "free to act in individual cases" or issue norms regardless of any consultation with another Church or Ecclesial Community.
"The course to be adopted, with due regard to all the circumstances of time, place, and persons,"  states, "is to be decided by local episcopal authority, unless otherwise provided for by the Bishops' Conference according to its statutes, or by the Holy See."

Notes

See also 
 Canon 915

References

Further reading

Sacramental law
Canon law of the Catholic Church
Catholic terminology
Latin words and phrases